Boguszyn may refer to the following places in Poland:
Boguszyn, Lower Silesian Voivodeship (south-west Poland)
Boguszyn, West Pomeranian Voivodeship (north-west Poland)
Boguszyn, Leszno County in Greater Poland Voivodeship (west-central Poland)
Boguszyn, Środa Wielkopolska County in Greater Poland Voivodeship (west-central Poland)